Hans Podlipnik-Castillo and Andrei Vasilevski were the defending champions but chose not to defend their title.

Romain Arneodo and Tristan-Samuel Weissborn won the title after defeating Sander Arends and Antonio Šančić 6–7(4–7), 7–5, [10–6] in the final.

Seeds

Draw

References
 Main Draw

Koblenz Open - Doubles
2018 Doubles